A car dealership, or car dealer, is a business that sells new or used cars, at the retail level, based on a dealership contract with an automaker or its sales subsidiary. Car dealerships also often sell spare parts and automotive maintenance services.

History of car dealerships in the United States

The early cars were sold by automakers to customers directly or through a variety of channels, including mail order, department stores, and traveling representatives. For example, Sears made its first attempt at selling a gasoline-engined chain-drive high-wheeler in 1908 through its mail-order catalog and starting in 1951 the Allstate through select its stores and the catalog.

The first dealership in the United States was established in 1898 by William E. Metzger. Today, direct sales by an automaker to consumers are limited by most states in the U.S. through franchise laws that require new cars to be sold only by licensed and bonded, independently owned dealerships. The first woman car dealer in the United States was Rachel "Mommy" Krouse who in 1903 opened her business, Krouse Motor Car Company, in Philadelphia, Pennsylvania.

Car dealerships are usually franchised to sell and service vehicles by specific companies. They are often located on properties offering enough room to have buildings housing a showroom, mechanical service, and body repair facilities, as well as to provide storage for used and new vehicles. Many dealerships are located out of town or on the edge of town centers. An example of a traditional single proprietorship car dealership was Collier Motors in North Carolina. Many modern dealerships are now part of corporate-owned chains with hundreds of locations. Dealership profits in the US mainly come from servicing, some from used cars, and little from new cars.

Most automotive manufacturers have shifted the focus of their franchised retailers to branding and technology. New or refurbished facilities are required to have a standard look for their dealerships and have product experts to liaise with customers. Audi has experimented with a hi-tech showroom that allows customers to configure and experience cars on 1:1 scale digital screens. In markets where it is permitted, Mercedes-Benz opened city centre brand stores.

Tesla Motors has rejected the dealership sales model based on the idea that dealerships do not properly explain the advantages of their cars, and they could not rely on third-party dealerships to handle their sales. However, in the United States, direct manufacturer auto sales are prohibited in almost every state by franchise laws requiring that new cars be sold only by dealers. In response, Tesla has opened city centre galleries where prospective customers can view cars that can only be ordered online. These stores were inspired by the Apple Stores. Tesla's model was the first of its kind, and has given them unique advantages as a new car company.

Dispute
At least one study has found that franchises increase car costs.

Additionally, the issuance of new dealership licenses is subject to geographical restriction; if there is already a dealership for a company in an area, no one else can open one. This has led to dealerships becoming in essence hereditary, with families running dealerships in an area since the original issuance of their license with no fear of competition or any need to prove qualification or consumer benefit (beyond proving they meet minimum legal standards), as franchises in most jurisdictions can only be withdrawn for illegal activity and no other reason.

This has led to consumer campaigns for establishment or reform, which have been met by huge lobbying efforts by franchise holders. New companies trying to enter the market, such as Tesla, have been restricted by this model and have either been forced out or been forced to work around the franchise model, facing constant legal pressure.

Multibrand car dealers
Multibrand and multimaker car dealers sell cars from different and independent carmakers. Some are specialized in electric vehicles.

Auto transport
Auto transport is used to move vehicles from the factory to the dealerships. This includes international and domestic shipping. It was largely a commercial activity conducted by manufacturers, dealers, and brokers. Internet use has encouraged this niche service to expand and reach the general consumer marketplace.

See also

 Auto auction
 Auto row
 Automaker
 Car broker
 Car rental
 List of auto dealership and repair shop buildings
 Showroom
 Used car

Organizations

 AutoBidsOnline
 Carfax
 Kelley Blue Book
 Federation of Automobile Dealers Associations of India (FADA)
 National Automobile Dealers Association
 Presidential Task Force on the Auto Industry

References

Further reading

External links

 EU car dealership reforms